"Mystery Girl" is the third single by American singer-songwriter Alexandra Savior from her album Belladonna of Sadness. It was released on November 18, 2016 via Columbia Records. A music video for the song was released on November 21, 2016, directed by Savior and New Zealand director Sam Kristofski.

Personnel
 Alexandra Savior – vocals
 Alex Turner – bass guitar, guitar, keyboards, synthesizers
 James Ford – drums, percussion, keyboards, synthesizers

References

2016 singles
Columbia Records singles
Alexandra Savior songs
Songs written by Alex Turner (musician)
Song recordings produced by James Ford (musician)
2016 songs
Songs written by Alexandra Savior